Goodsprings, Good Springs, or singular variations thereof may refer to:

Communities
Listed alphabetically by U.S. state
 Good Springs, Alabama, an unincorporated community in Limestone County
 Goodsprings, Alabama, an unincorporated community in Walker County
 Goodsprings, Nevada, an unincorporated community in Clark County
 Goodspring, Tennessee, an unincorporated community in Giles County
 Goodsprings, Tennessee, an unincorporated community in McMinn County

Other uses
Listed alphabetically by U.S. state
 Good Spring Baptist Church and Cemetery, in Kentucky
 Goodsprings Cemetery (Nevada)
 Goodsprings Schoolhouse, in Nevada
 Goodsprings Valley, in Nevada
 Goodsprings Waste Heat Recovery Station, in Nevada
 Good Spring Railroad, in Pennsylvania

See also